Karaj-e Olya (also Romanized as Karaj-e ‘Olyā) is a village in Dinavar Rural District, Dinavar District, Sahneh County, Kermanshah Province, Iran. At the 2006 census, its population was 160, in 46 families.

References 

Populated places in Sahneh County